Ross Burbank (born January 27, 1993) is an American football center who is currently a free agent. He played college football at Virginia.

Professional career

Oakland Raiders
Burbank signed with the Oakland Raiders as an undrafted free agent on May 10, 2016. He was waived on August 29, 2016.

Seattle Seahawks
On December 28, 2016, Burbank was signed to the Seattle Seahawks' practice squad. He signed a future contract with the Seahawks on January 16, 2017. He was waived on May 9, 2017.

Dallas Cowboys
On June 2, 2017, Burbank signed with the Dallas Cowboys. He was waived on September 2, 2017.

References

External links
Virginia Cavaliers bio

1993 births
Living people
American football offensive linemen
Virginia Cavaliers football players
Oakland Raiders players
Seattle Seahawks players
Dallas Cowboys players